Oakridge is a neighbourhood in Vancouver, British Columbia, Canada, with a multicultural residential and commercial area. It had a population of 13,030 in 2016, of which approximately 50 percent have Chinese as their mother tongue.

History
The Oakridge area was one of the last parts of Vancouver to be left in its natural state, with the exception of a golf course built near West 49th and Cambie in 1926 and some institutional construction including hospitals and boarding schools prior to World War II.

It was after the war that development began to expand into the wooded areas of Oakridge. The city's Jewish community moved south along Oak Street in the post-war years (the Jewish Community Centre was built at the intersection of West 41st and Oak), and the Canadian Pacific Railway opened its lands in the area to development that erupted in the 1950s. Much of the area was built with single-family homes, and the Oakridge Centre shopping mall, constructed in 1959 at West 41st and Cambie, provided a centrepoint for the residential boom.

Because of its later development, Oakridge is perhaps the least historic part of Vancouver. It was dominated by bungalow homes constructed in the 1950s and 1960s; however, in the last 10 years, many of these smaller houses have been torn down and have been replaced by larger multi-level residences.

A massive redevelopment of Oakridge Centre, which began in 2019, is currently ongoing to turn the suburban mall into a high-density, transit-oriented neighbourhood with multiple high-rises, the tallest in the city outside of the downtown peninsula, expected completion in 2027. It is deemed to become  a secondary business and commercial centre to Downtown Vancouver and the Broadway corridor.

Geography
Oakridge is a rectangular section of Vancouver bordered by the major thoroughfare Granville Street on the west and the busy multicultural route of Main Street on the east. West 41st Avenue marks the north border, with West 57th Avenue as the southern edge of the neighbourhood. Oak Street and Cambie Street, both among Vancouver's busiest roads, also run north-south through Oakridge, making for plenty of traffic during morning and evening rush hours. In total, Oakridge encompasses 401 hectares.

Demographics

Features
As a relatively young community, Oakridge is constantly evolving and growing in terms of its features and makeup. The Oakridge Centre mall - Vancouver's first shopping centre - is perhaps the largest draw bringing people into the neighbourhood. Langara College, which delivers a number of educational services to more than 23,000 students, is also located in Oakridge on West 49th east of Cambie.

Oakridge has expanded even more with the construction of the Canada Line along Cambie Street, which was completed in August 2009. Two stations, Oakridge – 41st Avenue Station and Langara – 49th Avenue Station, lie within Oakridge.

The city is conducting a "master planning" process for the Oakridge Centre area, potentially increasing retail, residential, commercial, office and community uses on the site.

References

External links

 DiscoverVancouver.com - Oakridge
 City of Vancouver - Oakridge History
 Langara College
 Oakridge Policy Planning Program

Neighbourhoods in Vancouver